Robert Lorne Richardson (June 28, 1860 – November 6, 1921) was a Canadian journalist, editor, newspaper owner, author, and politician.

Born in Balderson, Lanark County, Upper Canada, the son of Joseph Richardson and Harriet Thompson, Richardson was educated at the Balderson Public School and in 1879 became a journalist working for the Montreal Star and briefly for the Toronto Globe. He moved to Winnipeg in 1881 was the city editor for the Daily Sun until the paper stopped publishing in 1890. In 1890, he founded with Duncan Lloyd McIntyre the Winnipeg Daily Tribune and was its editor.

He was first elected to the House of Commons of Canada as the Liberal candidate for the electoral district of Lisgar in the 1896 election. He was re-elected in the 1900 election as an independent. The election was declared void in 1901 and he was defeated in the resulting 1902 by-election. He ran unsuccessfully again in three elections held in 1904, 1908, and 1912. He was elected for 
Springfield in the 1917 election.

He helped found the news service, Western Associated Press, in 1907 which was a forerunner of the Canadian Press. He was also the author of two novels Colin of the ninth concession: a tale of pioneer life in eastern Ontario (Toronto, 1903) and The Camerons of Bruce (Toronto, 1906).

He died in Winnipeg in 1921.

References

External links
 

1860 births
1921 deaths
Canadian newspaper editors
Canadian male journalists
Canadian male novelists
Canadian newspaper founders
Independent MPs in the Canadian House of Commons
Liberal Party of Canada MPs
Members of the House of Commons of Canada from Manitoba